Aizlewood is a surname. Notable people with the surname include:

John Aldam Aizlewood (1895–1990), British Indian Army general
Mark Aizlewood (born 1959), Welsh footballer and manager
Steve Aizlewood (1952–2013), Welsh footballer